Jiangzhou or Jiang Prefecture (江州) was a zhou (prefecture) in imperial China centering on modern Jiujiang, China. In the Yuan dynasty it was known as Jiangzhou Prefecture (江州路).

References
 

Prefectures of the Sui dynasty
Prefectures of the Tang dynasty
Prefectures of Yang Wu
Prefectures of Southern Tang
Prefectures of the Song dynasty
Prefectures of the Yuan dynasty
Former prefectures in Jiangxi